Sekolah Berasrama Penuh Integrasi Sabak Bernam (abbreviated INTESABER) is a boarding school located in Sabak Bernam, Selangor. It is one of the Sekolah Berasrama Penuh (SBP), or fully residential boarding schools, in Malaysia.

History
The school was started on 8 July 2002 with the first intake of students to form a total of 76 people. At that time the number of teachers were 15 people. Puan Hajah Nahyah was the first principal of this school. Mr Jaafar bin Rajuli as Senior Assistant, while Haji Ahmadi bin Abas served as Senior Assistant Student Affairs.

Initially, the school was named Sekolah Menengah Kebangsaan Agama (SMKA) Sabak Bernam. Therefore, the first intake of students this school run by the Selangor State Education Department (JPNS). The students were children of the state. Then, the school management was taken over by the Sekolah Berasrama Penuh Unit, Ministry of Education. In line with changes in management, the school changed its name to the Sekolah Menengah Agama Persekutuan Sabak Bernam (SEMERBAK) and changed to the Sekolah Berasrama Penuh Integrasi Sabak Bernam (SBPI Sabak Bernam). The next intake of students is open to other states throughout Malaysia.

Others
INTESABER located five kilometres from the town of Parit Baru in the district of Sabak Bernam. This school area covering 40 acres of 32 acres of fenced area of eight acres is fenced. The school was first set up in July 2000 and completed in July 2002 at a cost of RM 36 million. School buildings are divided into four zones, namely zone administration, the academic zone, residential zone and recreational and playground zones. Administrative zone contains a block of three floors and a large hall called the House of Ibn Khaldun. Academic zone consists of two blocks of two-storey building containing 36 classrooms, six laboratory units, three units of the workshop, a cafeteria and a mosque (Surau As-Syakirin).

Residential zone consists of two blocks of student hostels (boys and girls) (Villa D 'Prince / Princess), 16 units of quarters for teachers and school staff, the four units to the school, a block, dining hall (men and women) and playground. Recreation and playground zones contain a football field, a pavilion (Pavilion Glory), a field hockey, netball courts, sepak takraw and volleyball and two basketball courts, two security control booth and a bus garage. Now the school also has a campground that can accommodate over 300 participants at a time.

See also 
 List of schools in Selangor

References

External links
 

Educational institutions established in 2002
2002 establishments in Malaysia
Co-educational boarding schools
Islamic schools in Malaysia
Schools in Selangor